Turtle Islands Wildlife Sanctuary is a protected area in the municipality of Turtle Islands in Tawi-Tawi, Philippines.

Background
Together with three islands of neighbour country Malaysia and the surrounding coral waters, Turtle Islands are one of the world's few remaining major nesting grounds for the Green Sea Turtles. In 1996, the islands were declared as Turtle Islands Heritage Protected Area by the governments of the Philippines and Malaysia as the only way to guarantee the continued existence of the green sea turtles and their nesting sites.

For the five islands, the Philippine government decided to create special protection zones, and within this zones, only scientific and conservation activities are allowed. In other zones, certain rules are adapted to prevent too much impact by people on the environment and the turtles. Visiting these zones is only possible with strict guidance and under supervision of the staff of the officials of the government.

For a successful conservation and protection program, the support of the locals was very important. Fishing, for most of them, is the most important activity and source of income. Hunting sea turtles and collecting the turtle eggs for food, had always been a possible source for additional income. From the end of August to December, turtles come by the hundreds from the surrounding coastal waters, to lay and dig their eggs into the sand. The staff of the conservation project were able to succeed in convincing the locals the need to minimise their collecting activities. Local men, women and children, are now involved, helping with the protection activities.

Fauna
The Turtle Islands Wildlife Sanctuary is a recognized nesting ground for the Green sea turtle (Chelonia mydas) and the Hawksbill sea turtle (Eretmochelys imbricata), both of which are endangered species.

A possibility of 2nd otter species in the Philippines had been raised with the recording of two romps (two adults and one pup) of otters in the Turtle islands. Otters found in the island is most likely Smooth-coated otter according to otter specialists. The other species that can be found in the Philippines is the Asian small-clawed otter or locally known as dungon in Palawan.

See also
Turtle Islands National Park (Malaysia)

References

Protected areas established in 1999
1999 establishments in the Philippines
Geography of Tawi-Tawi